During the 2012–13 season, the Guildford Flames participated in the semi-professional English Premier Ice Hockey League. It was the 21st year of Ice Hockey played by the Guildford Flames and the sixth season under Paul Dixon as head coach.

The Flames, for the first time in their history, secured a back to back trophy by winning the league championship for the second time in as many seasons, thanks to a loss for the Basingstoke Bison, along with a single point during a 2–1 overtime loss at the Sheffield Steeldogs on Saturday 16 March 2013. Just four days later a capacity Spectrum witnessed a 'double, double' when the Flames repeated last year's entire trophy haul with a 5–3 Cup win, 9–5 on aggregate, over the visiting Slough Jets.

The Flames ended the regular league season with 79 points from 54 games. They won the league by a five-point margin with the Basingstoke Bison finishing as runners-up with 74 points from 54 games.

The Manchester Phoenix captured the playoff title, and brought a halt to the Flames treble bid, with a 5–2 victory.

Player statistics

Netminders
Mark Lee and James Hadfield shared an additional shutout.

Schedule and results

Pre-season

Regular season
The league consists of 54 games. The first home and away league games against each opponent (a total of 18 games) counts for both League and Cup table points.

|- align="center" bgcolor="#ccffcc"
| 1 || 15 September || Guildford Flames || 8–2 || Telford Tigers || || Mark Lee || 1,624 || 1–0–0 || League-Cup || 2
|- align="center" bgcolor="#ccffcc"
| 2 || 16 September || Bracknell Bees || 3–6 || Guildford Flames || || Mark Lee || N/A || 2–0–0 || League-Cup || 4
|- align="center" bgcolor="#ccffcc"
| 3 || 23 September || Guildford Flames || 5–2 || Milton Keynes Lightning || || Mark Lee || 1,868 || 3–0–0 || League-Cup || 6
|- align="center" bgcolor="#ccffcc"
| 4 || 29 September || Slough Jets || 0–5 || Guildford Flames || || Mark Lee || N/A || 4–0–0 || League-Cup || 8
|- align="center" bgcolor="#FFBBBB"
| 5 || 30 September || Guildford Flames || 5–6 || Bracknell Bees || || Tom Annetts || 1,508 || 4–1–0 || League-Cup || 8
|-

|- align="center" bgcolor="#FFBBBB"
| 6 || 6 October || Swindon Wildcats || 6–2 || Guildford Flames || || Dean Skinns || N/A || 4–2–0 || League-Cup || 8
|- align="center" bgcolor="white"
| 7 || 7 October || Guildford Flames || 4–5 || Sheffield Steeldogs || OT || Dimitry Zimozdra || 1,714 || 4–2–1 || League-Cup || 9
|- align="center" bgcolor="#FFBBBB"
| 8 || 13 October || Guildford Flames || 2–4 || Manchester Phoenix || || Steve Fone || 1,503 || 4–3–1 || League-Cup || 9
|- align="center" bgcolor="white"
| 9 || 14 October || Manchester Phoenix || 4–3 || Guildford Flames || OT || Steve Fone || N/A || 4–3–2 || League-Cup || 10
|- align="center" bgcolor="#ccffcc"
| 10 || 20 October || Peterborough Phantoms || 3–7 || Guildford Flames || || Mark Lee || N/A || 5–3–2 || League-Cup || 12
|- align="center" bgcolor="#ccffcc"
| 11 || 21 October || Guildford Flames || 6–2 || Basingstoke Bison || || Mark Lee || 1,557 || 6–3–2 || League-Cup || 14
|- align="center" bgcolor="#ccffcc"
| 12 || 27 October || Guildford Flames || 5–2 || Peterborough Phantoms || || Mark Lee || 1,736 || 7–3–2 || League-Cup || 16
|- align="center" bgcolor="#ccffcc"
| 13 || 28 October || Sheffield Steeldogs || 3–7 || Guildford Flames || || Mark Lee || N/A || 8–3–2 || League-Cup || 18
|- align="center" bgcolor="#FFBBBB"
| 14 || 31 October || Guildford Flames || 4–5 || Swindon Wildcats || || Dean Skinns || 1,587 || 8–4–2 || League-Cup || 18
|-

|- align="center" bgcolor="#FFBBBB"
| 15 || 4 November || Bracknell Bees || 4–3 || Guildford Flames || || Tom Annetts || N/A || 8–5–2 || League || 18
|- align="center" bgcolor="#FFBBBB"
| 16 || 10 November || Basingstoke Bison || 3–1 || Guildford Flames || || Stevie Lyle || 1,042 || 8–6–2 || League-Cup || 18
|- align="center" bgcolor="#ccffcc"
| 17 || 11 November || Guildford Flames || 3–2 || Basingstoke Bison || || Mark Lee || 1,420 || 9–6–2 || League || 20
|- align="center" bgcolor="#ccffcc"
| 18 || 17 November || Slough Jets || 3–5 || Guildford Flames || || Mark Lee || 527 || 10–6–2 || League || 22
|- align="center" bgcolor="#ccffcc"
| 19 || 18 November || Guildford Flames || 6–3 || Slough Jets || || Mark Lee || 1,520 || 11–6–2 || League-Cup || 24
|- align="center" bgcolor="#ccffcc"
| 20 || 24 November || Guildford Flames || 3–1 || Telford Tigers || || Mark Lee || 1,801 || 12–6–2 || League || 26
|-

|- align="center" bgcolor="#ccffcc"
| 21 || 1 December || Guildford Flames || 4–3 || Peterborough Phantoms || || Mark Lee || 1,675 || 13–6–2 || League || 28
|- align="center" bgcolor="#ccffcc"
| 22 || 2 December || Telford Tigers || 1–4 || Guildford Flames || || Mark Lee || N/A || 14–6–2 || League-Cup || 30
|- align="center" bgcolor="#ccffcc"
| 23 || 5 December || Telford Tigers || 1–4 || Guildford Flames || || Mark Lee || N/A || 15–6–2 || League || 32
|- align="center" bgcolor="#ccffcc"
| 24 || 8 December || Milton Keynes Lightning || 1–5 || Guildford Flames || || Mark Lee || N/A || 16–6–2 || League-Cup || 34
|- align="center" bgcolor="#ccffcc"
| 25 || 9 December || Peterborough Phantoms || 3–5 || Guildford Flames || || Mark Lee || N/A || 17–6–2 || League-Cup || 36
|- align="center" bgcolor="#ccffcc"
| 26 || 15 December || Guildford Flames || 3–2 || Bracknell Bees || PSO || Mark Lee || 1,572 || 18–6–2 || League || 38
|- align="center" bgcolor="#FFBBBB"
| 27 || 22 December || Basingstoke Bison || 1–0 || Guildford Flames || || Mark Lee || 1,330 || 18–7–2 || League || 38
|- align="center" bgcolor="#ccffcc"
| 28 || 23 December || Guildford Flames || 5–2 || Sheffield Steeldogs || || Mark Lee || 1,957 || 19–7–2 || League || 40
|- align="center" bgcolor="#ccffcc"
| 29 || 28 December || Swindon Wildcats || 5–7 || Guildford Flames || || Mark Lee || N/A || 20–7–2 || League || 42
|- align="center" bgcolor="#ccffcc"
| 30 || 30 December || Telford Tigers || 1–4 || Guildford Flames || || Mark Lee || N/A || 21–7–2 || League || 44
|-

|- align="center" bgcolor="#ccffcc"
| 31 || 1 January || Guildford Flames || 3–1 || Swindon Wildcats || || Mark Lee || 2,060 || 22–7–2 || League || 46
|- align="center" bgcolor="#ccffcc"
| 32 || 5 January || Guildford Flames || 3–0 || Peterborough Phantoms || || Mark Lee & James Hadfield || 1,555 || 23–7–2 || League || 48
|- align="center" bgcolor="#ccffcc"
| 33 || 6 January || Bracknell Bees || 4–6 || Guildford Flames || || Mark Lee || 1,291 || 24–7–2 || League || 50
|- align="center" bgcolor="#FFBBBB"
| 34 || 12 January || Manchester Phoenix || 6–1 || Guildford Flames || || Steve Fone || N/A || 24–8–2 || League || 50
|- align="center" bgcolor="#ccffcc"
| 35 || 13 January || Guildford Flames || 5–2 || Basingstoke Bison || || Mark Lee || 1,672 || 25–8–2 || League || 52
|- align="center" bgcolor="#ccffcc"
| 36 || 20 January || Guildford Flames || 4–2 || Sheffield Steeldogs || || Mark Lee || 1,572 || 26–8–2 || League || 54
|- align="center" bgcolor="#FFBBBB"
| 37 || 26 January || Milton Keynes Lightning || 2–1 || Guildford Flames || || Stephen Wall || 1,155 || 26–9–2 || League || 54
|- align="center" bgcolor="#ccffcc"
| 38 || 27 January || Guildford Flames || 7–4 || Telford Tigers || || Mark Lee || 1,770 || 27–9–2 || League || 56
|- align="center" bgcolor="#ccffcc"
| 39 || 30 January || Guildford Flames || 6–4 || Manchester Phoenix || || Mark Lee || 1,785 || – || Cup Semi-final, First Leg || –
|-

|- align="center" bgcolor="#ccffcc"
| 40 || 2 February || Sheffield Steeldogs || 3–5 || Guildford Flames || || James Hadfield || N/A || 28–9–2 || League || 58
|- align="center" bgcolor="#FFBBBB"
| 41 || 3 February || Guildford Flames || 1–2 || Milton Keynes Lightning || || Stephen Wall || 1,802 || 28–10–2 || League || 58
|- align="center" bgcolor="#ccffcc"
| 42 || 9 February || Guildford Flames || 7–4 || Manchester Phoenix || || Mark Lee || 1,662 || 29–10–2 || League || 60
|- align="center" bgcolor="#ccffcc"
| 43 || 10 February || Slough Jets || 2–5 || Guildford Flames || || Mark Lee || N/A || 30–10–2 || League || 62
|- align="center" bgcolor="#ccffcc"
| 44 || 16 February || Guildford Flames || 7–6 || Bracknell Bees || OT || Mark Lee || 1,855 || 31–10–2 || League || 64
|- align="center" bgcolor="#ccffcc"
| 45 || 17 February || Manchester Phoenix || 2–4 || Guildford Flames || || Mark Lee || N/A || 32–10–2 || League || 66
|- align="center" bgcolor="#ccffcc"
| 46 || 20 February || Guildford Flames || 7–1 || Manchester Phoenix || || Mark Lee || 2,016 || 33–10–2 || League || 68
|- align="center" bgcolor="#ccffcc"
| 47 || 23 February || Milton Keynes Lightning || 2–3 || Guildford Flames || || Mark Lee || 1,203 || 34–10–2 || League || 70
|- align="center" bgcolor="#ccffcc"
| 48 || 24 February || Guildford Flames || 4–3 || Slough Jets || || Mark Lee || 1,661 || 35–10–2 || League || 72
|-

|- align="center" bgcolor="#FFBBBB"
| 49 || 2 March || Manchester Phoenix || 4–3 || Guildford Flames || || Andrew Jaszczyk || N/A || – || Cup Semi-final, Second Leg || –
|- align="center" bgcolor="#ccffcc"
| 50 || 3 March || Guildford Flames || 7–1 || Milton Keynes Lightning || || Mark Lee & James Hadfield || 1,603 || 36–10–2 || League || 74
|- align="center" bgcolor="#FFBBBB"
| 51 || 6 March || Peterborough Phantoms || 6–3 || Guildford Flames || || Damien King || N/A || 36–11–2 || League || 74
|- align="center" bgcolor="#FFBBBB"
| 52 || 9 March || Basingstoke Bison || 4–2 || Guildford Flames || || Stevie Lyle || 1,495 || 36–12–2 || League || 74
|- align="center" bgcolor="#ccffcc"
| 53 || 13 March || Slough Jets || 2–4 || Guildford Flames || || Mark Lee || N/A || – || Cup Final, First Leg || –
|- align="center" bgcolor="#FFBBBB"
| 54 || 16 March || Sheffield Steeldogs || 2–1 || Guildford Flames || OT || Dalibor Sedlar || N/A || 36–12–3 || League || 75
|- align="center" bgcolor="#ccffcc"
| 55 || 17 March || Guildford Flames || 5–4 || Swindon Wildcats || PSO || Mark Lee & James Hadfield || 1,942 || 37–12–3 || League || 77
|- align="center" bgcolor="#ccffcc"
| 56 || 20 March || Guildford Flames || 5–3 || Slough Jets || || Mark Lee || N/A || – || Cup Final, Second Leg || –
|- align="center" bgcolor="#ccffcc"
| 57 || 23 March || Swindon Wildcats || 3–5 || Guildford Flames || || James Hadfield || N/A || 38–12–3 || League || 79
|- align="center" bgcolor="#FFBBBB"
| 58 || 24 March || Slough Jets || 5–4 || Guildford Flames || || Dan Milton || 1,775 || 38–13–3 || League || 79
|- align="center" bgcolor="#ccffcc"
| 59 || 30 March || Peterborough Phantoms || 1–4 || Guildford Flames || || Mark Lee || N/A || – || Playoff QF, 1st Leg || –
|- align="center" bgcolor="#ccffcc"
| 60 || 31 March || Guildford Flames || 7–2 || Peterborough Phantoms || || Mark Lee & James Hadfield || 2,083 || – || Playoff QF, 2nd Leg || –
|-

Playoff Finals Weekend

References

External links
Official Guildford Flames website

Guildford Flames seasons
Guil